Carmen Aída Barros Alfonso (born 7 January 1925) is a Chilean actress and singer of jazz, popular music, and opera. In addition, she is a professor of acting perception, diction, and vocal projection, and a theater and opera director. She is known for being the first to portray the character Carmela in the Isidora Aguirre play  in 1960.

Biography
Carmen Barros is the elder of two siblings. Because of her father's military profession, which caused him to be sent on missions in Germany, as well as to different garrisons in the country, Carmen never stayed more than seven months at one school. She lived between Santiago, other cities of the country, Peru, and Europe, and learned to speak German before Spanish.

However, she attended the French Nuns, a women's college where she was the "wild card" of the course for any artistic competition involving dancing or acting.

When she was 14, her father was assigned as Chilean ambassador to Germany, and that change marked her life. It was 1940, and World War II was in full development. A lot of people Barros' age that she met on this trip she never saw again; they joined Hitler's army to colonize Europe and fell out of contact. As a counterpoint, the cultural opportunities of Berlin influenced her future career: concerts, opera, theater; despite the horror of the war, that never changed. She tried to resume her basic education, in a German school, but could not stand being in a co-educational one, so she chose to retire and take private classes at home. However, she never finished her studies.

At age 19, Barros returned to Chile, but everything had changed. Santiago del Campo offered to let her sing on the radio and gave her the pseudonym Marianela. She had begun her career as a singer. She worked at Radio Agricultura, Corporación, and Minería. In 1946, when a company of New York's Metropolitan Opera House came to Chile with the Beethoven opera Fidelio, Barros was invited to participate. It was one of the great successes of the Municipal Theater. She was even invited to go to New York, but did not dare; she had been outside the country for too long.

Her brother was the one who spurred her interest in theater. He was an actor and creator of the Pocket Theater, and invited her to participate in the play Carlos y Ana, which she starred in. This continued until her father was named ambassador to Italy, and the dream vanished. She went to Italy with her husband and three children to see what happened there. She continued with her "operatic" work, went to live in Vienna, and was invited to take a leading role in the Opera of Brussels, Belgium. However her father was named chancellor and had to return home. She could never reconcile her dreams with distance. Although she endured another year without seeing her children, finally, and although her prospects were favorable, she returned to Chile in 1957.

Barros had the opportunity to become an international opera star. Also in 1965 she had a musical group, Los Gatos, which was very successful. After the 1973 Chilean coup d'état, she went to Kenya and worked as a UN official for nine years. Then she returned to Chile and began appearing on television. Her first series was Los títeres (1984), which together with her role on El amor está de moda (1995) was her greatest pride.

In 2010, she received the  Award for her artistic career.

This role earned her a nomination at the Caleuche Awards for Best Leading Actress in a TV Series in 2016.

In 2017, she received the Caleuche Award for her career from the Minister of Culture, Ernesto Ottone, and Chileactores. In March of the same year, she was honored as a Distinguished Public Person by the Municipality of Providencia.

Personal life
Her son Jaime Amunátegui Barros married Jacqueline Pinochet Hiriart on 24 January 1984 in Cerro Castillo, and the couple had two children: Sofía and Jaime Augusto Amunátegui Pinochet. In 2016, Barros told CNN Chile that Pinochet Hiriart "believed that I was a communist for being an artist."

Barros' daughter, Loreto Amunátegui Barros, was governor of Chacabuco Province from 2000 to 2006.

Carmen Barros defines herself as a Bacheletista – a supporter of President Michelle Bachelet.

Filmography

Film
 Bajo un cielo de gloria (1944)
 Música en tu corazón (1946)
  (1970)
 La Fiebre del Loco (2001)
 La chupilca del diablo (2012)
 The Guest (La Visita) (2014) Chile-Argentina
 El huésped (2014)
 Perla (2015)
 Viejos amores (2016)

Television

Theater
 Esta señorita Trini – Trinidad
  – Carmela de San Rosendo
 Javiera y su fantasma
 Como en la gran ciudad
 The boy friend
 Les Précieuses ridicules
 Anatole
 Mi Marilyn Monroe (2011) – Marilyn Monroe
 The Obscene Bird of Night (2012)
 El marinero (2015)

Awards and nominations

APES Awards

Caleuche Awards

References

External links
 

1925 births
Living people
20th-century Chilean actresses
21st-century Chilean actresses
Actresses from Santiago
Chilean film actresses
Chilean jazz singers
Chilean opera singers
Chilean pop singers
Chilean stage actresses
Chilean telenovela actresses
Chilean theatre directors
Singers from Santiago
Women theatre directors